The San Francisco 49ers entered professional football in 1946 as a member of the All-America Football Conference. The team joined the NFL along with the Cleveland Browns and the original Baltimore Colts in 1950. The 49ers' first draft selection in the NFL was Leo Nomellini, a defensive tackle from the University of Minnesota; the team's most recent pick was quarterback Trey Lance from North Dakota State University at number 3 overall.

Every year during April, each NFL franchise seeks to add new players to its roster through a collegiate draft known as "the NFL Annual Player Selection Meeting", which is more commonly known as the NFL Draft. Teams are ranked in inverse order based on the previous season's record, with the worst record picking first, and the second worst picking second and so on. The two exceptions to this order are made for teams that appeared in the previous Super Bowl; the Super Bowl champion always picks 32nd, and the Super Bowl loser always picks 31st. Teams have the option of trading away their picks to other teams for different picks, players, cash, or a combination thereof. Thus, it is not uncommon for a team's actual draft pick to differ from their assigned draft pick, or for a team to have extra or no draft picks in any round due to these trades.

The 49ers have selected the No. 1 overall pick three times: Harry Babcock in 1953, Dave Parks in 1964, and most recently, Alex Smith in 2005. In its first three years as an NFL team, the 49ers picked three consecutive future Hall of Famers in the first round: Leo Nomellini, Y. A. Tittle, and Hugh McElhenny; since then, the team has picked four more future Hall of Famers in the first round (Jimmy Johnson, Lance Alworth, Ronnie Lott and Jerry Rice), making it seven in total. However, Lance Alworth elected to sign with the San Diego Chargers of the American Football League instead of the 49ers of the NFL, and never played for San Francisco.

Key

Player selections

<onlyinclude>

Footnotes

References

San Francisco 49ers

49ers